Ad Astra is the quarterly magazine of the National Space Society (NSS). The name literally means "To the Stars". The magazine came into being following the merger of the L5 Society and the National Space Institute which became the NSS in 1987. The magazine was established in 1989. It is based in Washington DC. Currently, Ad Astra has a monthly circulation of approximately 52,000 (print and digital).

Imaginova, publisher of Space.com, published Ad Astra from 2005 to 2008. From 2008 until the company closed, the magazine was published by MM Publishing. The magazine was briefly published by Space.com until 2010, then reverted to internal publication by NSS contractors. Since 2017, Ad Astra's Editor-in-Chief has been Rod Pyle, a space journalist and historian, radio personality, and author of 17 books.

Regular columnists include John F. Kross, Rod Pyle, Pascal Lee, Emily Carney, Frank White (of the Overview Effect), Dale Skran, Nancy Atkinson, Anthony Paustian, Ben Evans, Al Globus, Elizabeth Howell, Manfred "Dutch" von Ehrenfried, Melissa Silva, and John Mankins. The magazine features the artwork of James Vaughan. The Ad Astra staff includes Editor-in-Chief Rod Pyle, Managing Editor Aggie Kobrin, Assistant Editor Melissa Silva, Copy Editor Shaun Kobrin, Contributing Editor John F. Kross, Art Director and Graphic Designer Michele Rodriguez, and Advising Art Director Geoffrey Notkin.

Awards 
Printing & Graphics Communications Association:
 Award of Excellence for 2003, 2002, 2001, 2000, 1999
 Best of Category for 2003, 2002
 Best Web Printed Piece for 2003

International Association of Business Communicators:
 Silver Inkwell Award of Excellence for 2002

References

External links 
 
NSS official website

Further reading 
 "National Space Society selects new publisher for Ad Astra magazine; New York City-based MM Publishing Inc. takes over publishing, editing duties in 2008" , Press release, November 28, 2007, National Space Society
 "National Space Society partners with Space.com to create new online destination for Ad Astra magazine; appoints Imaginova Corp. publisher of magazine" , Press release, January 31, 2005, National Space Society and Imaginova

Quarterly magazines published in the United States
Science and technology magazines published in the United States
Human spaceflight
Magazines established in 1989
Magazines published in Washington, D.C.
Space artists